Cody O'Connell (born November 25, 1994), nicknamed "The Continent", is an American college football player who was a guard for the Washington State Cougars. He earned consensus All-American honors as a junior in 2016, when he only received honorable mention for the all-conference team in the Pac-12.  He was named first-team All-Pac-12 as a senior. He redshirted the 2013 season coming off a knee injury suffered during his senior year at Wenatchee, then failed to appear in a game the following year. After a year of duty on special teams, he got his chance to start in 2016. That year, he finished as an Outland Trophy finalist and unanimous All-American (the second in school history, with former NFL kicker Jason Hanson) and was named honorable mention All-Pac-12 Conference selection after playing in all 13 games, starting 12 for the cougars. In 2017, O'Connell was named first team All-Pac-12 as he started all 13 games at left guard. The Associated Press voted him second-team All-American, as well.

References

External links
Washington State Cougars bio
Das Läuferknie
twitter

1994 births
Living people
All-American college football players
American football offensive guards
People from Wenatchee, Washington
Players of American football from Washington (state)
Washington State Cougars football players